Debbie Leonard (born November 22, 1951) is a former college women's basketball coach of Duke Blue Devils women's basketball and is currently a television commentator and State Farm agent.

Leonard was head coach at Duke from 1977–92 and led the team to a 212–190 overall record. She was ACC and District 3 Coach of the Year in 1984–85, when the team went 19–8. Her best win total came the next year when the team went 21–9 overall and 9–5 in the ACC, finishing third. She led the team to its first NCAA Tournament appearance in 1987.

She was an assistant Coach of the 1987 Junior National Team for the Jones Cup in Taipei. She was also an assistant coach at the 1987 U.S. Olympic Festival.

Leonard was named an ACC Legend in 2010. She is a 1970 graduate of North Davidson High School and 1974 graduate of High Point University, where she was a member of the women's basketball team.

Year by year
Source:

References

1951 births
Living people
American women's basketball coaches
American women's basketball players
Basketball players from North Carolina
Duke Blue Devils women's basketball coaches
High Point University alumni
High Point Panthers women's basketball players
People from Davidson County, North Carolina